Marston Moat is the site of a fortified manor house in the parish of Trudoxhill, Somerset, England. It has been designated as a Scheduled Ancient Monument. It is now on the Heritage at Risk Register due to animal burrowing.

It is situated east of the River Frome.

The site was held by the Bigot family of Marston Bigot before 1195. There is some evidence that they fortified it without a licence to crenellate from Edward II. As a result of this and an insult to the King's messenger Richard Bigot lost his titles to land, which were assigned to William de Meriet and John de Meriet.

It was leased as a farmhouse by the reign of Edward IV however none of the stone remains, and no full excavation has ever been carried out.

References

Scheduled monuments in Mendip District
Buildings and structures in Mendip District